Naomi Levine was an American actress, artist and filmmaker. She was a friend of Jack Smith and pop artist and filmmaker Andy Warhol. In 1964, she directed the film titled Yes.

Filmography 
 Jack Smith, Normal Love (1963)
 Andy Warhol, Tarzan and Jane Regained... Sort of (1963) as Jane
 Andy Warhol, Naomi's Birthday Party (1963)
 Andy Warhol, Kiss (1963)
 Andy Warhol, Naomi and Rufus Kiss (1964)
 Andy Warhol, Batman Dracula (1964)
 Andy Warhol, Couch (1964)

External links 
 

American film actresses
American film directors
American women film directors
Possibly living people
Year of birth missing (living people)
People associated with The Factory